Basel Dreispitz railway station is a railway station in the city of Basel, in the Swiss canton of Basel-Stadt. It is an intermediate stop on the Basel–Biel/Bienne line and is served by local trains only. The station was built in 2005 despite numerous objections from local residents and was opened in May 2006. In 2008 the station was awarded a Brunel Award by the Watford Group. It offers transfer possibilities on tram lines of Baselland Transport as well as bus lines of the same company and the Basler Verkehrs-Betriebe.

The suburban tram lines 10 and 11 of Baselland Transport stop on Münchensteinerstrasse, just west of the station building. South of Basel Dreispitz, the two lines leave the Basel tram network and move on to the  Basel–Dornach and Basel–Aesch railway lines.

Services 
Basel Dreispitz is served by the S3 of the Basel S-Bahn:

 : half-hourly service from Porrentruy or Laufen to Olten.

References

External links 
 
 

Railway stations in Switzerland opened in 2006
Railway stations in Basel-Stadt
Swiss Federal Railways stations